An Antarctic Specially Managed Area (ASMA) is a protected area on the continent of Antarctica, or on its adjacent islands. ASMAs are managed by the governments of Brazil, Poland, Ecuador, Peru, United States, New Zealand, Australia, Norway, Spain, United Kingdom, Chile, India, Russia, and Romania. The purpose of the ASMA sites are "to assist in the planning and coordination of activities within a specified area, avoid possible conflicts, improve cooperation between ATCPs and minimise environmental impacts. ASMAs may include areas where activities pose risks of mutual interference or cumulative environmental impacts, as well as sites or monuments of recognised historical value." Unlike the Antarctic Specially Protected Areas, ASMAs do not require a permit to enter.

List of ASMAs

|}

See also
Antarctic Specially Protected Area

External links
Official List of ASMA sites

References

 
Extreme points of Earth
Tourism in Antarctica